Waking Mars is a platform-adventure game produced by Tiger Style in which players jetpack through underground Mars caves and encounter a host of alien lifeforms that operate as an ecosystem. Players must master the behaviors of these creatures to create ecosystems of their own design to survive and discover the secrets of Mars' past. The game has been nominated for Best Mobile Game and Excellence in Audio in 2012 Independent Game Festival. In June 2012, Waking Mars was also named the Best Game of 2012 (So Far) by Paste.

The game was originally developed for iOS and released on iTunes in March 2012. Microsoft Windows, Mac OS X, Linux and Android versions of this game were released as part of the Humble Indie Bundle for Android 4 on November 8, 2012.

The game was released on Desura on December 5, 2012  and on Steam on December 13, 2012  after being successfully green-lit by the Steam users.

Reception 

The reception has been generally positive, with the game receiving favorable reviews on Steam as well as numerous other publications.

References

External links
 

2012 video games
IOS games
Android (operating system) games
Linux games
MacOS games
Windows games
GameClub games
Adventure games
Platform games
Indie video games
Video games developed in the United States
Video games set on Mars
Steam Greenlight games
Metroidvania games
Single-player video games